São Miguel is a concelho (municipality) of Cape Verde. It is situated in the northeastern part of the island of Santiago. Its seat is the city Calheta de São Miguel. Its population was 15,648 at the 2010 census, and its area is 77.4 km2. The municipality was created in 1996, when a parish of the older Municipality of Tarrafal was separated to become the Municipality of São Miguel.

Subdivisions
The municipality consists of one freguesia (civil parish), São Miguel Arcanjo. The freguesia is subdivided into the following settlements:

Achada Monte (pop: 1,652, town)
Calheta de São Miguel (pop: 3,175, city)
Casa Branca  (pop: 73)
Chã de Ponta (pop: 220)
Cutelo Gomes (pop: 658)
Espinho Branco (pop: 869)
Gongon (pop: 207)
Igreja (pop: 325)
Machado (pop: 130)
Mato Correia (pop: 328)
Monte Bode (pop: 118)
Monte Pousada (pop: 486)
Palha Carga (pop: 375) 
Pedra Barro (pop: 259)
Pedra Serrado (pop: 484)
Pilão Cão (pop: 1,132)
Pingo Chuva (pop: 63)
Ponta Verde (pop: 1,065) 
Principal (pop: 1,193)
Ribeireta (pop: 215)
Tagarra (pop: 669)
Varanda (pop: 445) 
Veneza (pop: 1,375)
Xaxa (pop: 114)

Demography

Politics
Since 2004, the Movement for Democracy (MpD) is the ruling party of the municipality. The results of the latest elections, in 2016:

In the September 2016 municipal elections, Herménio Fernandes won with an absolute majority and became president. At the federal level, São Miguel belongs to the constituency of Santiago North.

Notable people
Teodoro Mendes Tavares, current bishop of the Roman Catholic Diocese of Ponta de Pedras in Brazil

References

External links
 Official website 
 ANMCV (Associação Nacional dos Municípios Cabo-Verdianos - National Association of the Capeverdean Municipalities)

 
Municipalities of Cape Verde
Geography of Santiago, Cape Verde
1996 establishments in Cape Verde